Nimmakayala Kothapalle is a village in Uppalaguptam Mandal, Dr. B.R. Ambedkar Konaseema district in the state of Andhra Pradesh in India.

Geography 

Demographics 
 India census, Nimmakayala Kothapalle had a population of 6234, out of which 3149 were male and 3085 were female. The population of children below 6 years of age was 11%. The literacy rate of the village was 67%.

References 

Villages in Uppalaguptam mandal